Prase may refer to:

 Praše, a village in  Slovenia
 Chrysoprase, a gemstone variety of chalcedony
 Baka Prase (born 1996), Serbian YouTuber